The Kilauea Plantation or Kilauea Sugar Plantation was a large sugarcane plantation on the north side of Kauai island, Hawaii, including the community of Kilauea, Hawaii.  It was owned and operated by the 1880-incorporated Kilauea Sugar Company, which became the Kilauea Sugar Plantation, Co. from 1899 on.
The original property was bought by an American, Charles Titcomb, from Kamehameha IV by 1863 who used it for cattle ranching.  It was sold to Englishmen John Ross and E.P. Adams, who also leased additional land from Titcomb.  Ross and Adams planted sugarcane, then incorporated a firm.  It was operated as a plantation from 1880 to 1971.

Historic buildings 

Several historic buildings of the plantation survive, and are listed on the U.S. National Register of Historic Places (NRHP).  Among these are several stone buildings, of a local style that took advantage of fieldstone removed from sugarcane fields.  Temporary railway tracks were laid down to transport the fieldstone from piles beside the fields to the building locations.

Kilauea Plantation Manager's House 

The Kilauea Plantation Manager's House, at 4591 Kuawa Rd. in Kilauea, was NRHP-listed in 1993;  the listing includes three contributing buildings.

Kilauea Plantation Head Luna's House 

Also known at the William Akana Residence, the Kilauea Plantation Head Luna's House, at 2457 Kolo Rd. in Kilauea, also was NRHP-listed in 1993.

Kilauea Plantation Head Bookkeeper's House 

The Kilauea Plantation Head Bookkeeper's House, at 2421 Kolo Rd. in Kilauea, Hawaii, was built in 1930.  Its NRHP listing, also in 1993, included two contributing buildings. The main house was the seventh stone house built by the plantation, and is "a good example of the bungalow/craftsman style in Hawaii".

Kilauea School 

The school for the community was the Kilauea School, located on the edge of the plantation, at 2440 Kolo Rd., Kilauea, Hawaii.  It was built in 1922 and is NRHP-listed, but is not built of stone.  It was listed for its architecture and its association with the community.

Kong Lung Store 

This was a grocery store for plantation workers, located on W. side of Lighthouse Rd., about .5 mi N. of HI 56., and is listed on the National Register.  Built in c.1941, it was the last stone building built by the plantation.

Railway 

References 

Sugar plantations in Hawaii
Buildings and structures in Kauai County, Hawaii
Houses in Kauai County, Hawaii
Agricultural buildings and structures on the National Register of Historic Places in Hawaii
Houses on the National Register of Historic Places in Hawaii
Houses completed in 1926
Houses completed in 1930
Houses completed in 1931
Defunct companies based in Hawaii
Food and drink companies established in 1880
Food and drink companies disestablished in 1971
1880 establishments in Hawaii
1971 disestablishments in Hawaii
National Register of Historic Places in Kauai County, Hawaii